Irena Roterman-Konieczna (born 13 March 1950) is a Polish biochemist and a professor at the Jagiellonian University Medical College.

Biography 
Irena Roterman-Konieczna was born on 13 March 1950 in Kraków. She received a master's degree in chemistry in 1973 at the Jagiellonian University, her doctorate in 1985 at the Medical College there, and a postdoctoral degree there in 1996. In 2005 she received the title of professor. She has been the head of the Department of Bioinformatics and Telemedicine at the Jagiellonian University, and an editor in chief of the Bio-Algorithms and Med-Systems journal.

Works 
Irena Roterman-Konieczna is the author of numerous scientific studies on the structure and function of proteins and amyloids. In 2020, she was included in the group of "2%" or "160,000 most influential researchers in the world".

Her publications include:

References 

1950 births
People from Kraków
Jagiellonian University alumni
Academic staff of Jagiellonian University
Polish biochemists
Living people